Sychnovalva crocea is a species of moth of the family Tortricidae. It is found in Brazil in the states of Paraná, Santa Catarina and Minas Gerais.

References

	

Moths described in 2000
Archipini